"O the Deep Deep, Love of Jesus" is a well-known Christian hymn, written by the London merchant Samuel Trevor Francis.  Francis (1834–1925) had a spiritual turning point as a teenager, contemplating suicide one night on a bridge over the River Thames.  Experiencing a renewal of faith, he went on to author many poems and hymns and was a preacher in addition to his merchant career.

The song compares Jesus' love to the ocean in scope, emphasizing the limitless, unchanging, and sacrificial nature of God's affections for the singer and all of humanity.  It consists of three stanzas each utilizing an A, A, B, B  rhyming structure.  Various melodic and harmonic arrangements of the song have been published, the most common being a minor melody in 4/4 time.

Versions 
 Beecher Hymn tune by John Zundel and Henry Ward Beecher
 Pure Piano Panoramas (2000) by Jeff Bjorck. Uses a variation of the Ebenezer tune
 Hiding Place (2004) by Selah. Uses a variation of the Ebenezer tune
 "O the Deep, Deep Love of Jesus!" (2004) by David Ward
 Be Still My Soul (2006) by Ann Walsh (Ebenezer tune)
 Come Weary Saints (2008) by Sovereign Grace Music (text adapted by Bob Kauflin, music by Bob Kauflin)
 Sweet Exchange (2010) by Heather Payne and Terry Jones
 "Oh, the Deep Deep Love of Jesus" (2016) by Audrey Assad

References

External links 
 "O the deep deep love of Jesus" on "Center for Christian music" (story, lyric, sheet music)

English Christian hymns
British poems
1875 songs
Songs about Jesus
Songs based on poems
19th-century hymns